Olivier Dubuquoy (born 1974) is a French geographer, documentarist and environmental activist known for his denunciation of the pollution of the Mediterranean by red sludge and his actions for an end to our dependency on fossil fuels deemed responsible for global warming. He is the founder of the citizens' movement Nation Océan and the society for the preservation of climate and the marine environment ZEA.

University studies 
Olivier Dubuquoy studied history and geography at Aix-Marseille University (AMU). In 1999-2000, he was involved in research centred on ancien paleoenvironments at Sidon, Lebanon. 

The following year, he wrote a master's thesis on the subject of the settling of the Roma in France. 

In 2004 he completed a doctor's degree with a thesis entitled L'apprenti nomade : entre représentation et imagination.

Teaching and Research 
Olivier Dubuquoy  next became a lecturer and researcher in geography at Aix-Marseille University.

In 2008-2009 he took part in a scientific expedition called La Planète Revisitée organized jointly by the Muséum national d'histoire naturelle in Paris and the Institut de recherche pour le développement (IRD) for inventorying threatened species in biodiversity hotspots in Mozambique and Madagascar.

In 2009 he was selected for an art residence as part of the photographic project "Salvador/ Hambourg / Marseille : passé et présent de la mondialisation," organized by the Goethe-Institut and Alliance française.

At the end of 2013, he became a research engineer at the University of Toulon.

Between 2016 and 2019, he has been a corresponding member of the Centre Norbert Elias, an interdisciplinary research centre for anthropologists, sociologists and historians.

Since 2022 he has been an associate researcher at the Civil Societies, Urban and Territorial Transitions in the Mediterranean Chair.https://www.chaire-mediterranee-transitions.fr/

Commitments 
Olivier Dubuquoy has been committed to the protection of the ocean and the climate since 2011. He is intent on exposing the lobbying and disinformation practices encountered in the alumina production sector, the recyclers of hazardous wastes and the oil and gas industry.

Red mud 
As a whistleblower, Olivier Dubuquoy in 2011 unveiled a confidential impact assessment commissioned in 1993 by the late Pechiney conglomerate and acknowledging the high toxicity of the red sludge laden with heavy metals produced by its alumina plant at Gardanne, Bouches-du-Rhône.

Since then, he has been actively campaigning against red mud from the Gardanne plant being dumped on land or discharged at sea (a pollution that has been going on since 1893). Among other things, he maintains a petition asking the French government to ban red waste, so far 400,000 signatures have been logged.

In 2014 he arranged for scientific analyses to be carried out, highlighting the dangers to health posed by the Mange-Garri dumping site run by Alteo, successor to Pechiney, at Bouc-Bel-Air. There, red mud awaits recycling under the commercial name of "bauxaline". 

That same year, he started filing lawsuits against Alteo with the help of Hélène Bras, a Montpellier barrister specializing in public law and environmental law and representing local fishermen and  inhabitants working or living next to the site.

In 2016 with Laetitia Moreau, he co-directed a documentary – Zone rouge – histoire d’une désinformation toxique – dealing with the disinformation strategies and techniques developed by alumina industrialists to downplay their pollution. 

In 2017, Zone rouge was awarded an honourable mention from the jury at the Festival international du grand reportage d’actualité et du documentaire de société (FIGRA). and also at the Mémoires de la mer Festival.

In February 2019, red mud waste originating from the Alteo plant in Gardanne, Bouches-du-Rhône, was dumped outside the French Ministry of Ecology by ZEA.

In 2022 he succeeds in putting an end to new red mud pollution from the Gardanne plant, Boues rouges : retour sur une victoire environnementale

Ending dependency on fossil fuels 
In favor of sobriety and opposed to dependence on fossil fuels, Olivier Dubuquoy has fought against oil and gas exploration and exploitation licences with a view to reducing the impact of fossil fuels on global warming and preventing the extinction of living species.
 
While taking part in the fight against the Rhône Maritime hydrocarbon exploration licence in 2012, he tackled another "hidden licence" presented as a project for scientific drilling in the Gulf of Lion, GOLD (for Gulf Of Lion’s Drilling). The drilling was to have been supported by five oil companies, intent on disguising commercial exploration under the cloak of scientific research. The permit was cancelled in 2012.

In 2013 and 2014, he led the battle against the Abyssea corporation and its Centre d’essais et d’expertise en mer profonde (Ceemp), a global testing platform for accelerating the exploration and exploitation of hydrocarbons in deep water that was to have been erected off the île du Levant, right in the midst of the Pelagos Sanctuary for Mediterranean Marine Mammals. The project was cancelled by Ségolène Royal, the then ecology minister.

From Nation Océan to ZEA 

On October 17, 2015, at La Seyne-sur-Mer, Olivier Dubuquoy, along with José Bové and Canadian environmental activist Paul Watson and agroecology pioneer Pierre Rabhi, co-founded the Nation Océan grassroots movement, based on the "Déclaration universelle de l'océan" (DUO) demanding for oceans to be considered a "common". The "Déclaration universelle de l'océan" was introduced to the European Parliament and the United Nations Organisation in 2017. 

In her 2016 documentary Océan, naissance d’une nation ("Ocean, Birth of a Nation"), Aurine Crémieu narrates the birth of the movement by following in the steps of whistleblower Olivier Dubuquoy who warns politicians of the risks associated with the overexploitation of offshore exclusive economic zones. He stops at Brussels (to meet with José Bové), then at COP 21 (to meet with Ségolène Royal).

In 2016, Olivier Dubuquoy took part in the non-violent blockading of the Marine Construction and Engineering Deepwater Development (MCEDD) oil and gas summit at Pau, Pyrénées-Atlantiques, whose object was to accelerate the exploration and exploitation of hydrocarbons in deep water.

That same year, Olivier Dubuquoy tackled an Italian exploration licence for Zone E in the Mediterranean, off the coasts of Corsica and Sardinia, resulting in the permit being cancelled at the end of 2017.

In 2017, in order to formalize the citizens' movement Nation Océan, he founded ZEA, a society for the preservation of climate and the marine environment  (ZEA being the initials of "zone écologique autonome" as well as the first syllable of Zealandia, literally "country of the sea").

In 2020 Organization of meetings and creation of a network of French collectives against pollution and unnecessary large imposed projects.

Publications 

 with Christophe Morange et al., Nouvelles données paléo-environnementales sur le port antique de Sidon. Proposition de datation, National Museum News Tenth Issue: The Millenium Edition, 1999, pp. 42-48.
 with Christophe Morange et al., Étude paléoenvironnementale du port antique de Sidon. Premiers résultats du programme CEDRE, Méditerranée, tome 94, 1-2-2000, Ports antiques et paléoenvironnements littoraux, Christophe Morhange dir., pp. 91-100.
 with Edouard Gaudot, The Ocean: From Colonized Territory to Global Nation, Green European Journal, Vol. 12, 2016, October 24, 2016 (in French: L'Océan : du territoire colonisé à la nation planétaire, in greeneuropeanjournal.eu).
 Boues rouges et économie circulaire, une désinformation toxique, MilleBabords.org, August 22, 2013.

Documentaries 
 with Laëtitia Moreau, Zone rouge – histoire d’une désinformation toxique, Les films d'ici, 2016 (review by François Ekchajzer dated October 21, 2016, in Télérama)
 with Aurine Crémieu, Océan, naissance d'une nation, 2016 (review by Xavier Thomann dated June 10, 2016, in Télérama)
 Irréductibles, 2022, Olivier Dubuquoy présente son documentaire "Irréductibles" en avant-première à Toulon in Var Matin Critique du film Irréductibles dans le Monde.

References 

 

French ecologists
living people
1974 births